Rashid Akbar Khan Nawani is a Pakistani politician and a member of the 13th National Assembly from NA-74 (Bhakkar-II). He was elected to National Assembly in 2008 as an independent but then joined Pakistan Muslim League (N). In that election, he polled 98,366 votes while his nearest rival Muhammad Afzal Khan Dhandla of PML (N) got 86,688. He has 6 children, 3 sons and 3 daughters.

References

Living people
Pakistan Muslim League (N) politicians
Politicians from Punjab, Pakistan
People from Bhakkar District
Punjabi people
Year of birth missing (living people)
Pakistani MNAs 1988–1990
Pakistani MNAs 1993–1996
Pakistani MNAs 2002–2007
Pakistani MNAs 2008–2013